Gordon Webber may refer to:
 Gordon Webber (author)
 Gordon Webber (artist)
 Gordon Webber (politician)